The men's 4 × 400 metres relay at the 2017 IAAF World Relays was held at the Thomas Robinson Stadium on 22–23 April.

In the final, American David Verburg took an immediate lead, opening up a gap on French, Brazilian and Cuban teams to his inside, and making up the three turn stagger on Botswana's Isaac Makwala (the #7 400 meter runner of all time) to his outside while still in the second turn.  USA had a clear lead at the handoff with Tony McQuay breaking several metres ahead of Demish Gaye for Jamaica on the far outside.  Down the backstretch Trinidad and Tobago's Jereem Richards,  Botswana's Baboloki Thebe and Britain's Delano Williams lined up, breaking away from the other teams.  Through the turn Thebe moved onto Richards' shoulder.  Richards responded and moved up to Gaye, the three teams virtually even until Thebe fell back before the handoff.  Trinidad gained position on the handoff to Jarrin Solomon, who found himself only two metres back of American Kyle Clemons.  Down the backstretch, Jamaica's Martin Manley ran around Solomon and pulled to within a metre of Clemons coming off the final turn.  As Manley tied up, Solomon came back to his shoulder with Botswana's Onkabetse Nkobolo making a big rush on the outside to make it a 3-way battle behind the Americans.  At the handoff, American LaShawn Merritt started slowly and took a secure handoff.  Meanwhile, Botswana's handoff to Karabo Sibanda was almost as efficient as a 4x100 handoff, Botswana gaining the advantage and moving right behind Merritt.  Behind, Jamaica's Steven Gayle pushed down the backstretch, passing Sibanda and even, for a moment, Merritt on the inside.  Merritt fought back and held off Gayle going into the final turn but Sibanda used that moment to sprint around the outside, gaining a microscopic lead on Merritt.  Merritt successfully held Sibanda to the outside, making him run the extra distance through the turn.  Coming off the turn, Merritt had gained a slight advantage but Sibanda was not done, making one more charge at Merritt down the final straightaway.  Merritt held Sibanda off again, USA taking a 1-metre win.

Records
Prior to the competition, the records were as follows:

Schedule

Results

Heats
Qualification: First 2 of each heat (Q) plus the 2 fastest times (q) advanced to the final. The next 8 fastest times qualified for the final B.

Final B

Final

References

4 x 400 metres relay
4 × 400 metres relay